Tammiste is a village in Tori Parish, Pärnu County in southwestern Estonia.

It had a station on the Tallinn - Pärnu railway line operated by Elron, which closed in December 2018.

References

 

Villages in Pärnu County